The 334th Fighter Squadron is a United States Air Force unit. It is assigned to the 4th Operations Group and stationed at Seymour Johnson Air Force Base, North Carolina.

The 334th was constituted on 22 August 1942 as an incorporation of the No. 71 Squadron RAF, an Eagle Squadron of American volunteers in Great Britain's Royal Air Force. After the United States entered the war, the squadron was transferred to the U.S. Army Air Forces. It was officially constituted by War Department letter on 12 August 1942, and was activated at Bushey Hall, England on 12 September 1942.

Overview
The "Eagles" fly the McDonnell Douglas F-15E Strike Eagle. Its aircraft are identified by the "SJ" tail code and blue fin flash.

Currently, the squadron provides worldwide deployable aircraft and personnel capable of executing combat missions in support of worldwide Aerospace Expeditionary Force deployments to combat areas as part of the Global War on Terrorism.

History

World War II

The 334th, along with the 335th and 336th Fighter Squadrons, was assigned to the VIII Fighter Command 4th Fighter Group, which was the first United States Army Air Forces unit activated in the European Theater during World War II, which was located in Essex, England.

The 334th flew British Supermarine Spitfire fighters until the arrival of Republic P-47 Thunderbolt aircraft in 1943. After about a year the squadron switched to North American P-51 Mustangs. During World War II, the 334th had a total of 395 kills against the Luftwaffe; 210 kills in the air and 185 on the ground.

Korean War

Equipped with the Lockheed F-80 Shooting Star, the 334th moved to Andrews Air Force Base in April 1947. In 1949 the 334th moved to Langley Air Force Base, where they were re-equipped with the North American F-86 Sabre.

In November 1950, the 334th were sent to the war in Korea. During the war they were credited with 142 kills, and they had six pilots who achieved ace status.

The 334th remained in Korea until 8 December 1957. They moved to Seymour Johnson Air Force Base as a unit of the 4th Fighter Wing. The 334th flew the North American F-100 Super Sabre until 1959, when the squadron transitioned to the Republic F-105 Thunderchief.

Major James Jabara, Captain Manuel J. "Pete" Fernandez, Major George A. Davis, Medal of Honor recipient, and Major Frederick "Boots" Blesse; the second, third, fourth and sixth (respectively) leading aces of the Korean War were assigned to the 334th. Future astronaut Captain Gus Grissom was assigned to the 334th during the Korean War.

Vietnam War

In September 1965 the 334th relocated to Holmsted AFB because the runway at their home base Seymour Johnson AFB was being re-built. In August the 334th TFS moved to McConnell Air Force Base, Kansas and exchanged their F105Fs for F-105Ds, and flew non-stop to Hickam Air Force Base, then on to Anderson Air Force Base, Guam, and on to Takhli Royal Thai Air Force Base, Thailand. From Takhli combat missions were flown to North Vietnam and Laos. Being on temporary duty, the 334th left their Thuds to be part of the developing 355th Tactical Fighter Wing, and in February 1966 returned to Seymour-Johnson. In January 1968 the 334th went to Korea to support operations during the Pueblo incident. The 334th then returned to Seymour Johnson.

From February 1968 through June 1969, 4TFW Commander Colonel Chuck Yeager flew with the 334th as an 'attached' pilot.

In April 1972, in the midst of a Tactical Air Command ORI, the 334th TFS was deployed to Ubon AB, Thailand after which the squadron was attached to the 25th TFS. The unit began combat operations almost immediately. Soon after the deployment to SEA, the operations officer, Maj Tokanel, lobbied for missions specifically flagged for the 334th TFS. The unit was deployed through Linebacker I and Linebacker II, flying air-to-ground and air-to-air combat missions. The squadron was redeployed back to Seymour Johnson AFB in March 1973.

Gulf War
The 334th flew its first sorties with the McDonnell Douglas F-15E Strike Eagle on 1 January 1991. Throughout the month the 334th served as the host unit for multiple units deploying to Operation Desert Shield. Also, 334th aircrews and support personnel deployed to Operation Desert Storm as augmentees. On 18 June 1991, the squadron became operational on the F-15E, and deployed to Saudi Arabia the next day to relieve elements of the 335th Fighter Squadron, providing combat air patrol and ground alert forces supporting withdrawal of troops from Operation Desert Storm

Lineage
 Constituted as the 334th Fighter Squadron on 22 August 1942
 Activated on 12 September 1942
 Redesignated 334th Fighter Squadron, Single Engine on 20 August 1943
 Inactivated on 10 November 1945
 Activated on 9 September 1946
 Redesignated: 334th Fighter Squadron, Jet Propelled on 23 April 1947
 Redesignated: 334th Fighter Squadron, Jet on 14 June 1948
 Redesignated: 334th Fighter-Interceptor Squadron on 20 January 1950
 Redesignated: 334th Fighter-Bomber Squadron on 8 March 1955
 Redesignated: 334th Fighter-Day Squadron on 25 April 1956
 Redesignated: 334th Tactical Fighter Squadron on 1 July 1958
 Redesignated: 334th Fighter Squadron on 1 November 1991

Assignments
 4th Fighter Group, 12 September 1942 – 10 November 1945
 4th Fighter Group (later 4th Fighter-Interceptor Group, 4th Fighter-Bomber Group, 4th Fighter-Day Group), 9 September 1946
 4th Fighter-Day Wing (later 4th Tactical Fighter Wing, 4th Wing) 8 December 1957 
 (attached to 65th Air Division 1 April – 13 August 1963)
 attached to the following PACAF organizations during the Viet Nam War:
 (Seventeenth Air Force 15 February – 29 May 1965)
 (355th Tactical Fighter Wing 2 September 1965 – 5 February 1966)
 (354th Tactical Fighter Wing 16 December 1969-c. 31 May 1970)
 (8th Tactical Fighter Wing 11 April – 5 August 1972 and 30 September 1972 – 18 March 1973)
 attached to the following USAFE organization during the Cold War:
 (86th Tactical Fighter Wing, 28 August– 29 September 1980, 26 August – 29 September 1981, and 22 May – 20 June 1984)
 4th Operations Group, 22 April 1991 – present

Stations

 RAF Bushey Hall (AAF-341), England, 12 September 1942
 RAF Debden (AAF-356), England, 29 September 1942
 RAF Steeple Morden (AAF-122), England, c. 23 July – 4 November 1945
 Camp Kilmer, New Jersey, 9–10 November 1945
 Selfridge Field, Michigan, 9 September 1946
 Andrews Field (later Andrews Air Force Base), Maryland, 26 March 1947
 Langley Air Force Base, Virginia, 4 May 1949
 New Castle County Airport, Delaware, 13 August – 11 November 1950
 Johnson Air Base, Japan, 13 December 1950
 Taegu Air Base (K-2), South Korea, 23 February 1951
 Suwon Air Base (K-13), South Korea, 15 March 1951
 Johnson Air Base, Japan, 1 May 1951
 Kimpo Air Base (K-14), South Korea, 24 August 1951
 Chitose Air Base, Japan, 20 September 1954
 Misawa Air Base, Japan, 1 July – 8 December 1957
 Seymour Johnson Air Force Base, North Carolina, 8 December 1957 – present (deployed to McCoy Air Force Base, Florida 21 October – 29 November 1962, Moron Air Base, Spain 1 April – 13 August 1963, Incirlik Air Base, Turkey 15 February – 29 May 1965, Takhli Royal Thai Air Force Base, Thailand 2 September 1965 – 5 February 1966, Kunsan Air Base, South Korea 16 December 1969 – c. 31 May 1970, Ubon Royal Thai Air Force Base, Thailand 11 April – 5 August 1972 and 30 September 1972 – 18 March 1973, Ramstein Air Base, Germany 28 August – 29 September 1980, 26 August – 29 September 1981 and 22 May – 20 June 1984

Aircraft

 Supermarine Spitfire, 1942–1943
 Republoic P-47 Thunderbolt, 1943–1944; 1947
 North American P-51 (later F-51) Mustang, 1944–1945, 1948–1949
 Lockheed P-80 Shooting Star, 1947–1949

 North American F-86 Sabre, 1949–1958
 North American F-100 Super Sabre, 1958–1960
 Republic F-105 Thunderchief, 1959–1966
 McDonnell F-4 Phantom II, 1969–1989
 McDonnell Douglas F-15E Strike Eagle, 1990–present

Notable squadron members
 Art Donahue - World War II
 Frederick "Boots" Blesse - Korean War
 George A. Davis - Korean War
 Manuel J. "Pete" Fernandez - Korean War
 Gus Grissom - Korean War
 James Jabara - Korean War
 William T. Whisner Jr. - Korean War
 Chuck Yeager - Cold War-era
 Ralph Jodice - Gulf War-era
 Norman Seip - Gulf War-era
 John N.T. "Jack" Shanahan - Gulf War-era
 Jay B. Silveria - Gulf War-era

Emblems

References

 Notes

 Citations

Bibliography

External links
 Global Security
 4th Fighter Group Association WWII

Fighter squadrons of the United States Air Force
Fighter squadrons of the United States Army Air Forces
Military units and formations in North Carolina